At the 2001 East Asian Games, the athletics events were held in Osaka, Japan from 23 to 26 May 2001. A total of 45 events were contested, of which 23 by male and 22 by female athletes. All events were held at the Nagai Stadium, with the exception of the racewalking and half marathon events. A team of Australian athletes took part in the competition but they were excluded from the medal tally. This was the last time that Kazakhstan competed in the competition.

In the third edition of the multi-sport event, 20 Games records were improved over the four-day athletics competition. China had the greatest gold medal haul with 27, largely due to the success of their women athletes, who won all but three of the women's events. The hosts, Japan, won the most medals overall, winning 11 golds, 22 silvers and 51 medals in total. The women's events over 400 metres brought a number of Japanese records: Kazue Kakinuma broke the 400 m sprint record, Makiko Yoshida set a new record in the 400 metres hurdles, and the 4×400 metres relay team made a new national best of 3:33.06. Seventeen-year-old Liu Xiang set a new 110 metres hurdles record of 13.42 for the first gold medal of his career.

All the Games records in the relay races were broken, meaning that both Shingo Suetsugu (who broke the 200 metres record) and Bu Fanfang (who broke the 400 m record) made new Games records in multiple events. Some athletes took on two individual events in the competition schedule and doubled their medal hauls: Gennadiy Chernovol took 100 m gold and 200 m silver while his Kazakh compatriot Mihail Kolganov won gold in the 800 and 1500 m. Wu Wen-Chien did a bronze double in the 5000 m and steeplechase for Chinese Taipei, and Dong Yanmei won two golds in the 5000 and 10,000 m events. Kumiko Ikeda of Japan set personal bests in the long jump and 100 metres hurdles for a silver and bronze medal, respectively.

Records

Medal summary

Men

Women

 Events marked † were won by Australian guest athletes:
Men's 1500 m – Clinton Mackevicius in 3:44.87 
Women's 400 m hurdles – Sonia Brito with 56.17 m
Women's hammer – Bronwyn Eagles with 67.08 m

Medal table

References
General
East Asian Games. GBR Athletics. Retrieved on 2010-02-28.
Nakamura, Ken (2001-05-25). Day One of the East Asian Games. IAAF. Retrieved on 2010-02-28.
Nakamura, Ken (2001-05-25). Day two of the East Asian Games in Osaka. IAAF. Retrieved on 2010-02-28.
Sato, Shigemi (2001-5-27). Ma's protege wins second gold at East Asian Games. IAAF. Retrieved on 2010-02-28.
Nakamura, Ken (2001-05-28). Day three of the East Asian Games in Osaka. IAAF. Retrieved on 2010-02-28.
Nakamura, Ken (2001-05-28). Day Four of the East Asian Games in Osaka. IAAF. Retrieved on 2010-02-28.
Specific

External links
Official Olympic Council of Asia website

2001 East Asian Games
2001
East Asian Games
International athletics competitions hosted by Japan